Stiria consuela is a species of moth in the owlet moth family Noctuidae. It is found in North America.

References

Further reading

 
 
 

Amphipyrinae
Articles created by Qbugbot
Moths described in 1900